Carastelec is a commune located in Sălaj County, Crișana, Romania. It is composed of two villages, Carastelec and Dumuslău (Szilágydomoszló).

At the 2002 census, 90.1% of inhabitants were Hungarians and 9.2% Romanians. 84.2% were Roman Catholic, 9.3% Romanian Orthodox, 3.4% Pentecostal and 2.8% Reformed.

See also
Wooden Church, Dumuslău

References

Communes in Sălaj County
Localities in Crișana